John Hudson Guy was Chief Justice of Jamaica in 1749.

References 

Chief justices of Jamaica
Year of birth missing
Year of death missing
18th-century Jamaican judges